Julianna Barwick is an American musician who composes using electronic loops. Her first album, The Magic Place, was released in 2011.

Music career
Barwick has said that her music is influenced by her participation in church choir while growing up in Louisiana. She composes with a machine to create electronic loops built around her vocalizing.

She self-released her debut EP, Sanguine, in 2006. The songs are wordless with vocal overdubs, vocal percussion, and improvisation. On the EP, Florine, she uses a loop station and pedals to create minimalist repetition accompanied by layers of vocals and synthesizers. In 2010, Barwick was commissioned to remix "Reckoner" by Radiohead. During the next year, she released an album of improvisational music, FRKWYS Vol. 6, with Ikue Mori.

She recorded her first full-length album, The Magic Place, on a rehearsal stage because it was soundproof and had a piano. The title of the album refers to a tree on her family's farm that was big enough to crawl into, as though the tree contained rooms shaped by the trunk and branches. In 2012, she formed the duo Ombre with Helado Negro and recorded the album Believe You Me.

The title of her second album, Nepenthe, was inspired by the death of a relative. The name comes from the drug of forgetfulness found in ancient Greek literature and the work of Edgar Allan Poe. The album features the string ensemble Amiina and a choir of teenage girls.

In 2016, the song "Nebula", from her third album Will premiered on NPR. A music video directed by Derrick Belcham was shot at the historic Philip Johnson Glass House.

On December 20, 2019, she released an EP, titled Circumstance Synthesis, and in July 2020 she released her fourth album Healing Is a Miracle.

Discography

Solo studio albums

Collaborative studio albums

EPs

References

American women singers
Living people
New-age musicians
Musicians from Louisiana
Asthmatic Kitty artists
Place of birth missing (living people)
American women in electronic music
Dead Oceans artists
Year of birth unknown
Year of birth missing (living people)
21st-century American women